Hamad Al-Hammadi (Arabic:حمد الحمادي) (born 12 February 1991) is an Emirati footballer who plays as a defender.

External links

References

Emirati footballers
1991 births
Living people
Al Jazira Club players
Al Dhafra FC players
Al-Ittihad Kalba SC players
Al-Wasl F.C. players
Ajman Club players
UAE Pro League players
Association football defenders